Christopher Vythoulkas (born 15 February 1984) is a former Bahamian multi-discipline professional swimmer. He represented his country at the 2004 Summer Olympics in the 100 metre backstroke and qualifying in the 100 metre butterfly.

Major championships which he represented the Bahamas:

 1999 Pan Am Games 
 2001 US Open (Medalist)
 2002 Commonwealth Games 
 2003 US Open
 2003 Pan Am Games
 2004 Olympics
 2005 World Championships
 2006 Commonwealth Games
 2007 World Championships
 2007 Pan Am Games
 Lowest World Ranking: 10th
 Lowest Commonwealth Ranking: 4th
 Christopher holds numerous Bahamian and Caribbean records.

At the 2006 Commonwealth Games he swam in four events. He finished 25th in 50 metres freestyle, 13th in 50 metres backstroke, 19th in 100 metres backstroke and 15th in 50 metres butterfly

References

1984 births
Living people
Bahamian male swimmers
Male backstroke swimmers
Male butterfly swimmers
Bahamian male freestyle swimmers
Olympic swimmers of the Bahamas
Swimmers at the 2004 Summer Olympics
Swimmers at the 2006 Commonwealth Games
Swimmers at the 2002 Commonwealth Games
Swimmers at the 2003 Pan American Games
Swimmers at the 1999 Pan American Games
Pan American Games competitors for the Bahamas
Commonwealth Games competitors for the Bahamas
Florida State Seminoles men's swimmers
Florida State University alumni